Religious ministry may refer to:
Minister (Christianity)
Christian ministry, activity by Christians to spread or express their faith 
Ministry of Jesus